Beryl Franklin Anthony Jr. (born February 21, 1938) is an American lawyer and former politician who represented Arkansas in the United States House of Representatives.

Early life and education
Anthony was born in El Dorado, Arkansas. He attended the Union County public schools, graduating from El Dorado High School in 1956. In 1961, he received a Bachelor of Science and Bachelor of Arts degrees from the University of Arkansas, Fayetteville where he became a member of the Sigma Chi fraternity. He obtained a Juris Doctor from the  same university in 1963.

Legal career prior to Congress
Anthony was admitted to the Arkansas bar in 1963 and began practice in El Dorado. He became assistant attorney general from 1964 to 1965; deputy prosecuting attorney in Union County from  1966 to 1970; prosecuting attorney for the 13th Judicial District from 1971 to 1976, and legal counsel to Anthony Forest Products Co. in 1977. He started his own private practice of law in 1977.

Political career
Anthony was a delegate to Arkansas State Democratic conventions from 1964 to 1978. In November 1978, he was elected as a Democrat to the United States House of Representatives and served seven terms, from January 3, 1979 to January 3, 1993. He lost his bid for renomination in the Democratic Primary runoff in June 1992 to Arkansas Secretary of State William J. "Bill" McCuen who lost the general election to Republican Jay W. Dickey due to a series of embarrassing incidents. McCuen received campaign funding from the National Rifle Association (NRA) due to Anthony’s support of legislation limiting so-called “Cop Killer” bullets.

Vice president of his freshman class in Congress, Anthony was a founding member of the Sunbelt Coalition, a group that monitored the legislative impact upon southern states. After one term, he was appointed to the House Ways and Means Committee. He also served on the Oversight and Trade Subcommittees as well as the Select Committee on Children, Youth, and Families. Anthony chaired the Democratic Congressional Campaign Committee from 1987 to 1991. He maintained a conservative voting record in Congress, similar to other Southern Democrats.

As a member of the Ways and Means Committee, Anthony pursued a variety of important issues. In the 1980s, he played a major role in restructuring the Social Security trust fund. He championed legislation for improved rural health care, for which he was given awards by both the Arkansas Hospital Association and the American Hospital Association. In his last terms, he focused on international trade, working on the North American Free Trade Agreement and on legislation for the General Agreement on Tariffs and Trade.

In 1988, Congress created the bipartisan Anthony Public Finance Commission, composed of mayors, governors, local government officials, and members of the finance community, to recommend legislation to enable local governments to better finance the building of roads, schools, hospitals, and wastewater treatment facilities. The commission's Arbitrage Relief Provision, enacted in 1989, substantially lessened the borrowing costs for infrastructure investments.

Activities after leaving Congress
In January 1993, Anthony became a partner in the Washington, D.C. office of Winston & Strawn. His clients have included major trade associations, governmental entities, and national and multinational corporations. On Capitol Hill and before the White House and executive agencies, Anthony has worked on matters involving health care reform, Superfund, trade relations with China, tax law changes affecting pharmaceuticals, and authorization and funding of major weapons systems. He was a member of the board of directors of Beverly Enterprises which in 2006 before its acquisition by a private equity firm, operated 345 skilled nursing facilities, 18 assisted living centers, and 56 hospice/home care centers.

Personal
Anthony's wife, Sheila Foster Anthony is the sister of Vince Foster, the deputy White House counsel who committed suicide in 1993. The couple's first child was born in 1964. She was a teacher before getting a law degree. In 1993, after working in the U.S. Commerce Department as the nominated Assistant Secretary for Legislation and Intergovernmental Affairs for several months, she moved to the U.S. Department of Justice in a similar position, where she worked for two years. From 1997 to 2002, she was a commissioner at the Federal Trade Commission.

Notes

External links

Biography, Stennis Center for Public Service, a federal, legislative branch agency, accessed October 15, 2007
 

1938 births
Living people
Democratic Party members of the United States House of Representatives from Arkansas
People from El Dorado, Arkansas
Arkansas lawyers
University of Arkansas alumni
People associated with Winston & Strawn
Members of Congress who became lobbyists